The  is an electric multiple unit (EMU) train type operated by the private railway operator Semboku Rapid Railway.

Sets introduced in 2007 are designated as 7020 series.

7000 series 
Trainsets are formed as follows:

Six-car sets

Four-car sets

Two-car sets

7020 series 
Trainsets are formed as follows:

Six-car sets

Four-car set

Two-car set

Interior 
Seating consists of longitudinal seating throughout.

History 
The 7000 series first appeared in 1996. It is the second original design for the Semboku Railway following the 5000 series.

These are the second series in the Semboku fleet to feature aluminum bodies and VVVF inverters.

The 7020 series was introduced in 2007 and implements a selection of improvements to the original 7000 series including more handstraps, stanctions, and distinguishable priority seating. The difference between the 7020 series and the 7000 series is that the 7020 series has a distinguishable single centered front door.

Operations 

Special liveries 
As the flagship rolling stock of the Semboku Rapid Railway, the trainsets have been painted in various promotional liveries. From April 2015 through 2018, 7020 series set 7521 was wrapped in a livery to promote the 20th anniversary of the opening Izumi-Chūō station. Starting in October 2017, 7000 series set 7509 was wrapped in a livery to promote characters featured at the Osaka Prefectural Children's Center. This wrap was named "Frontier" from October 2017.

References

External links 

 7000 series official rolling stock website (in Japanese)
 7020 series official rolling stock website (in Japanese)

Electric multiple units of Japan
Train-related introductions in 1996
Train-related introductions in 2007
Rail transport in Osaka Prefecture
Semboku Rapid Railway
Kawasaki multiple units
1500 V DC multiple units of Japan